Tower Grove South is a neighborhood of south St. Louis, Missouri. Formerly known as Oak Hill, Tower Grove South is bounded by Arsenal Street on the north, Chippewa Street on the south, Kingshighway Boulevard on the west, and Grand Boulevard on the east. The majority of the neighborhood was built following the extension of streetcar lines from downtown St. Louis. Commercial development in the neighborhood is concentrated on Grand Boulevard in the east and Morganford Road in the west of the neighborhood. There are also scatterings of commercial and mixed use buildings on interior intersections.

During the 1990s through the present, the neighborhood has been reversing a slow decline with the widespread rehabilitation of residential, commercial, and mixed use structures. The Grand Boulevard business district on the eastern flank of the neighborhood was the first urban business district in the neighborhood to see rehabilitation and new pedestrian scale construction. After 2000, the smaller Morganford Road business district on the west side of the neighborhood has also seen substantial reinvestment in the form of new restaurants, bars, retail, and a neighborhood scale storefront grocery store, specializing in Natural foods and locally grown foods.

Demographics
In 2020 the neighborhood's population was 57.6% White, 21.8% Black, 0.4% Native American, 7.7% Asian, 7.6% Two or More Races, and 4.8% Some Other Race. 8.4% of the population was of Hispanic or Latino origin.

See also
 Tower Grove Park
 Tower Grove East, St. Louis
 Schnucks, large local grocery store chain in the area

References

Sources

External links 

 Tower Grove South neighborhood website
 Tower Grove Heights neighborhood website
 South Grand Community Improvement District South Grand business district information
 Grand South Grand South Grand business district information

Neighborhoods in St. Louis